The Portaferry–Strangford ferry service crosses Strangford Lough in Northern Ireland at its narrowest point, close to where the lough joins the Irish Sea. The ferry links the two disconnected sections of the A2 road, Muff to Portaferry and Strangford to Newry. There has been a ferry service between Portaferry and Strangford for four centuries without a break.

History
In 1611 James I granted land on either side of the Lough to Peirce Tumolton in order to maintain and crew a ferry boat. In 1835 a group of local people formed the "Portaferry and Strangford Steamboat Company" and commissioned the building of the Lady of the Lake, which was the first steam ferry in Ireland. This venture was not commercially successful and the ferry was sold in 1839. In 1913 three passengers were lost when a ferry capsized. In 1946 two converted World War II landing craft were introduced, capable of accommodating about 36 passengers and two motor cars, but the following year one of these capsized with the loss of one life. 

Various vessels were in use until 1969 when the Down District Council took over operation of a ferry capable of carrying vehicles and passengers. To operate the service, MV Strangford was built by the Verolme Shipyard in Cork. In 1975 the Welsh ferry Cleddau King was purchased and used as reserve ferry under the name MV Portaferry Ferry. In 2001, a new vessel named  was brought into service, relegating MV Strangford to a support role and releasing the MV Portaferry Ferry for disposal. A second new vessel, was delivered in 2016 but her introduction was delayed until February of the following year when it was discovered that she was unable to discharge cars at high tide.

Operation
Transport NI, an executive agency of the Northern Ireland Department for Infrastructure, operates the ferry service. Ferries depart each terminal every 30 minutes and convey about 500,000 passengers per annum. Vehicles and their drivers are carried for a fee with additional vehicle passengers or foot passengers also charged. Senior citizens resident in either Northern Ireland or the Republic of Ireland with the appropriate documentation are permitted free passage. The service is responsible for transporting more than 300 school students every day between schools in Portaferry, Downpatrick and Ballynahinch, County Down subsidised public service operates at a loss of more than £1m per year but is viewed as  an important transport link to the Ards Peninsula.

During the COVID-19 pandemic the Ferry service continued to operate for essential travellers. But was severely reduced, with fewer services and fewer operating hours, Normal Service was resumed in August 2020.

Fleet

Gallery

References

External links

Ferry timetable
Ferry fares
Ferry accessibility

Ferry companies of Northern Ireland